Bogus may refer to:

Entertainment and media
 Bogus (film), a 1996 film starring Whoopi Goldberg
 Bogus (game), alternative name of the dice game Dice 10000
 Mr. Bogus, a 1992 animation
 Bogus, a scandalous or sarcastic publication (especially in nineteenth-century United States universities, e.g. one at Indiana University in 1890 investigated by Pinkertons)

Other
 Bogus (surname)
 Bogus Basin mountain resort in Idaho
 Bogus (Ruby), application for testing computer code

See also
 
 Bogon (disambiguation)
 Counterfeit
 Fake (disambiguation)
 BogoMips
 Bogosort